Lee Morris may refer to:
 Lee Morris (American football) (born 1964), American football player
 Lee Morris (footballer) (born 1980), English footballer
 Lee Morris (musician) (born 1970), English drummer